The 2012 Kentucky Wildcats football team represented the University of Kentucky in the 2012 NCAA Division I FBS football season. The team, led by third-year head coach Joker Phillips, played their home games at Commonwealth Stadium in Lexington, Kentucky, US, and compete in the Eastern Division of the Southeastern Conference (SEC).  On November 4, 2012, Kentucky Athletic director Mitch Barnhart announced that the university would not retain Phillips as head coach after the season.

2012 signing class
24 recruits signed letters of intent to Kentucky for the 2012 season.

Schedule

Schedule Source:

Personnel

Roster

Depth chart

Starters per game
Offense

Defense

2013 recruiting class

References

Kentucky
Kentucky Wildcats football seasons
Kentucky Wildcats football